Manoocher Deghati (born 1954 in Urmia, Iran) is an Iranian-French photojournalist.

Documenting the Iranian Revolution
In the summer of 1978, Manoocher Deghati, educated as a filmmaker, returned to Iran after three years of studies at the Rome school of cinema just as the first major demonstrations against the regime of the Shah were breaking out. He decided to photograph these events.
I remember going out the first day with a camera in hand. There was a great deal of agitation. A truckload of soldiers rolled by. One of them loaded his rifle and fired at me. The burst of bullets passed on either side of my head. I was alive. I was shocked. But above all, I realized that I was a target because I was taking pictures. That only reinforced my determination to take pictures. 

In 1979, the Sipa Press agency had asked him to become a permanent correspondent in Iran. Manoocher photographed all the big events of the new regime of Khomeini, the hostage crisis at the American embassy and the Iran-Iraq war, which he covered for six years.

In order to be able to go to the front independently of 'tours' organized expressly for foreign journalists, one had to agree not to send any photos abroad...As for me, I wanted to break down censorship and barriers, to show really what the battlefields looked like before they had been tidied up for official pictures. I had to do without the agreements with state organisms to which I promised pictures for military publications or propaganda posters. To do that, one had to negotiate for months. Despite the distrust of officials, they needed my eye, my specialty. Each time, I was accompanied by at least two "bodyguards." They closely watched what pictures I was taking, gave me a quota of films. They kept track of them, sometimes destroying the negatives or censoring them.  Many images disappeared, but I succeeded anyway in preserving and distributing a good part of my work.

In 1983, Manoocher Deghati received the "World Press" first prize in the news category for the photos included here of the Iran-Iraq War.

In 1985, Manoocher was forbidden to leave his home carrying a camera. So he left Iran and went into exile in France. In 1987, Agence France-Presse asked him to assume the direction of the agency's first regional bureau in Central America. Manoocher followed the guerrilla war in El Salvador, the fight between Contras and Sandinistas in Nicaragua, the civil war in Guatemala, and the American incursion in Panama.

"What interested me most was to cover the different stages in the peace process which took place in that period," he says. To witness the absurdity of war, while showing the values of peace is what Manoocher continued to do thereafter, in the Middle East as in North Africa and former Yugoslavia.

Post 1990
In 1990, he covered the Persian Gulf War. From 1991 to 1995 he was based in Cairo as director of the AFP regional photo service. He notably photographed the rise of Islamist militancy in Egypt, the war and famine in Sudan and Somalia. Leaving that region for reportage in ex-Yugoslavia, he returned to follow the first steps of Israeli-Palestinian negotiations. From 1995, based in Jerusalem for AFP, he concentrated on this question,

With his brother Reza, he co-founded Webistan Photo Agency  which has been distributing their own images but also those of several other photographers since 1991.

In September 1996, Manoocher was gravely wounded by an Israeli sniper in Ramallah, on the West Bank of the Jordan, during a confrontation between Israelis and Palestinians. Repatriated to France, he spent two years in physical therapy at the Invalides hospital for war veterans. He used this time to interview and report on the veterans of all the French wars of this century, from the “poilus” of 1914-18 to the UN blue helmets wounded in ex-Yugoslavia. Since December 1998, Manoocher has worked for the AFP bureau in Paris.

From 1998 to 2001, Manoocher covered the international and national stories for the Agence France Presse.  In 2000, he was wounded covering the visit of the French Prime Minister, Lionel Jospin, in Ramallah, Palestine. When he recovered from wounds, he went to Afghanistan in 2002 to found Aina Photo  which has become the first and most important supplier of photographs from that country. Aina Photo which is part of Aina NGO  (founded by Reza Deghati) aims at providing all necessary material to afghan photojournalists to become independent and self-reliant.

Currently Manoocher Deghati is Middle East Regional Photo Editor for the Associated Press, based in Cairo, Egypt.

Awards
 1980 	American Deadline Press Club, Special Achievement Prize.
 1983 	World Press Photo, 1st Prize.
 1986 	World Press Photo, 3rd Prize.
 1996 	11th International Festival of SCOOP and Journalism in Angers, 1st Prize.
 2001	Georges Benderheim Prize, Paris
 2004  Howard Chapnick Award for Advancement of Photojournalism, New York
 Fuji Prize, 1st Prize in France
 AFP Best Picture of the month : March 1991, August 1992, July 1994, October 1995, March 1996, February 2000

References

External links
 
 Aina Photo

Iranian photojournalists
French photojournalists
French people of Iranian descent
French people of Azerbaijani descent
People from Urmia
1954 births
Living people